GMH railway station Is a former station that spurred off the Gawler line. The station was located within the General Motors Holden car manufacturing factory in the northern Adelaide suburb of Elizabeth South.

The start of the spur was approximately halfway between the Elizabeth South and Nurlutta stations. It closed in 1992, and the station demolished, but some of the track that leads to the station is still intact. As of 20 January 2011, the line itself has now been covered over leaving only bits of the line intact near GMH  and towards the Gawler line.

Primarily an industrial station, it was only served by trains during shift change times at Holden. There were two platforms of step-down construction. Most trains ran express between Adelaide and Salisbury before terminating here.

References 

Disused railway stations in South Australia
Railway stations closed in 1992